Brian James Rosenberg (born September 17, 1985) is an American former professional baseball pitcher. He threw right-handed, and was primarily a relief pitcher. Rosenberg was born in Newport News, Virginia, but attended Meade County High School in Kentucky. Subsequently, he attended the University of Louisville, where he played for four years and graduated prior to the Philadelphia Phillies drafting him in the 2008 Major League Baseball Draft. He progressed through the Phillies minor league system over the next several years, and ultimately made his Major League debut June 9, 2012. Over the remainder of that season and the 2013 season, he split time between the Phillies' Triple-A affiliate the Lehigh Valley IronPigs and the Major League squad.

Career

Philadelphia Phillies
Coming out of the University of Louisville, he played college baseball for the Cardinals (where he earned a degree in sports administration), Rosenberg was drafted by the Philadelphia Phillies in the 13th round of the 2008 draft. He spent the following three seasons in the lower levels of the Phillies' farm system, acting primarily as a closer. Between 2008 and 2010, he recorded 33 saves in 48 games while posting a 12–4 record between three levels despite being briefly sidelined with a latissimus dorsi injury.

He opened the 2011 season with the AA Reading Phillies, where he briefly served as a starting pitcher.  That season, he recorded a 4.17 ERA with a 5–7 record in 39 games. After again opening the 2012 season with the Reading Phillies, he was promoted to the Triple-A Lehigh Valley IronPigs.

On June 9, 2012, he was added to the Phillies' 25-man active roster.  He made his Major League debut that same day against the Baltimore Orioles, allowing two runs in one inning of work to pick up the loss in extra innings. He pitched in 57 games over parts of three seasons for the Phillies and was 4-2 with a 5.72 ERA.

Rosenberg was outrighted off the Phillies roster on October 27, 2014.

Los Angeles Dodgers
Rosenberg signed a minor league contract with the Los Angeles Dodgers on January 30, 2015. The Dodgers released him on April 5.

References

External links

Player Bio: B.J. Rosenberg at University of Louisville Sports

1985 births
Living people
Sportspeople from Newport News, Virginia
Major League Baseball pitchers
Louisville Cardinals baseball players
Williamsport Crosscutters players
Lakewood BlueClaws players
Clearwater Threshers players
Yaquis de Obregón players
American expatriate baseball players in Mexico
Florida Complex League Phillies players
Mesa Solar Sox players
Reading Phillies players
Scottsdale Scorpions players
Lehigh Valley IronPigs players
Philadelphia Phillies players
Mat-Su Miners players